The phrase no quarter was generally used during military conflict to imply combatants would not be taken prisoner, but killed.

According to some modern American dictionaries, a person who is given no quarter is "not treated kindly" or "treated in a very harsh way".

Etymology 
The term may originate from an order by the commander of a victorious army that they will not quarter (house) captured enemy combatants. Therefore, none can be taken prisoner and all enemy combatants must be killed. A second derivation, given equal prominence in the Oxford English Dictionary (OED), is that quarter (n.17) can mean "Relations with, or conduct towards, another" as in Shakespeare's Othello, Act II, scene iii, line 180, "Friends all ... In quarter, and in termes, like bride and groome". So "no quarter" may also mean refusal to enter into an agreement (relations) with an enemy attempting to surrender. The OED mentions a third possible derivation but says "The assertion of De Brieux ( (1672) 16) that it arose in an agreement between the Dutch and Spanish, by which the ransom of an officer or private was to be a quarter of his pay, is at variance with the sense of the phrases to give or receive quarter."

History
During the English Civil War, the English parliament issued the 24 October 1644 Ordinance of no quarter to the Irish, in response to the Irish Confederacy electing to send troops in support of Charles I, against the English Parliament:

By the 17th century, siege warfare was an exact art, the rules of which were so well understood that wagering on the outcome and duration of a siege became a popular craze; the then enormous sum of £200,000 was alleged to have been bet on the outcome of the Second Siege of Limerick in 1691. 

Professional honour demanded a defence, but if a garrison surrendered when "a practicable breach" had been made, they were given "quarter". The garrison signaled their intent to surrender by "beating the chamade"; if accepted, they were generally allowed to retain their weapons, and received a safe conduct to the nearest friendly territory. If a garrison continued their defence beyond this point, the surrender was not accepted, hence "no quarter"; the besiegers were then "permitted" to sack the town, and the garrison was often killed.

In some circumstances, the opposing forces would signal their intention to give no quarter by using a red flag (the so called bloody flag). However, the use of a red flag to signal no quarter does not appear to have been universal among combatants.

Black flags have been used to signify that quarter would be given if surrender was prompt; the best known example is the Jolly Roger used by pirates to intimidate a target crew into surrender. By promising quarter, pirates avoided costly and dangerous sea battles which might leave both ships crippled and dozens of critical crew dead or incapacitated.

Other "no quarter" incidents took place during the 1850 to 1864 Taiping Rebellion, and at Tippermuir in 1644, Scots Covenanters used the battle cry "Jesus, and no quarter", signifying they would not take prisoners.

International humanitarian law
Under international humanitarian law, "it is especially forbidden ... to declare that no quarter will be given". This was established under Article 23 (d) of the 1907 Hague Convention IV - The Laws and Customs of War on Land. Since a judgment on the law relating to war crimes and crimes against humanity at the Nuremberg Trials in October 1946, the 1907 Hague Convention, including the  explicit prohibition to declare that no quarter will be given, are considered to be part of the customary laws of war and are binding on all parties in an international armed conflict.

See also
 List of established military terms
 Ordinance of no quarter to the Irish
 Oriflamme
 Safe conduct - A contrasting policy; a guarantee of unharassed passage through enemy territory.

Notes

Sources
 
 
 
 

Law of war
War crimes by type